The International Journal of Private Law is a quarterly peer-reviewed law journal covering all aspects of private law, including audio-visual, media, communication, and space law. It is intended to cover the legal issues facing individuals, entrepreneurs, and business owners on an international scale. The editor-in-chief is Sylvia Kierkegaard. Occasionally, the journal publishes special issues on important topics in private law. The journal is abstracted and indexed by Scopus.

References

External links 
 

Law journals
Private law
Quarterly journals
English-language journals
Publications established in 2008
Inderscience Publishers academic journals